Protein Wnt-9b (formerly Wnt15) is a protein that in humans is encoded by the WNT9B gene.

The Wnt family of genes produce glycolipoproteins that are involved with signaling and developmental processes. Like other Wnt genes, Wnt-9b codes for the Wnt-9b protein which participates in the canonical Wnt/β-catenin signaling pathway. Wnt-9b is a gene found on chromosome 17 in region 17q21. It can be traced to function in the establishment of the kidneys, because Wnt9 is critical for morphogenesis of the nephron. This gene can impact kidney function in more than one way. Improper expression of the gene can cause cyst development on the kidney tubules, and in mice, mutant Wnt9 genes that cause lower protein concentrations resulted in failure of the kidneys to thrive shortly after birth. Wnt-9b is a gene that often expressed in the epithelial cells of the Wolfian duct in early male and female embryos. In the embryos, Wnt11 is expressed at the branching points of the kidney tubules while Wnt-9b is expressed in a higher concentration at the stalk of the tubules. Wnt-9b has also been tied to the involvement of neural differentiation by induction of retinoic acid, according to the NCBI.

References